Galhi (also Romanized as Galhī; also known as Galehhī) is a village in Murmuri Rural District, Kalat District, Abdanan County, Ilam Province, Iran. At the 2006 census, its population was 58, in 13 families. The village is populated by Lurs.

References 

Populated places in Abdanan County
Luri settlements in Ilam Province